Sanyati is a town in Zimbabwe.

Location
The town is located in Kadoma District, in Mashonaland West Province, in northern central Zimbabwe. The coordinates of Sanyati are: 17° 57' 0.00"S, 29° 18' 27.00"E (Latitude:17.9500; Longitude:29.3075).

Overview
The town of Sanyati and the surrounding sub-district known as Sanyati Subdistrict lie in an area known as the Sanyati Tribal Trust Lands, which is a major cotton-producing area in Zimbabwe. The town is the location of Sanyati Baptist Mission. The mission owns and administers: (a) Sanyati Baptist Hospital (b) Sanyati Baptist Primary School and (c) Sanyati Baptist High School. In the central business district, the main activities include welding, carpentry and masonry. Activities related to farming (farm supply shops and produce purchase points) are also prevalent in the town. ZB Bank Limited, a commercial bank, and Share Wealth (Pvt) Ltd, a microfinance service, maintain branches in town. The town is also served by Sanyati Baptist Mission AirportA lodge is also available by the name Sanyati Rendezvous,  located next to council offices.

History

Chenjiri farms is the home town of Fungai Chaderopa, who became the first Sanyati woman member of parliament in March 2008.

Population
In 2012, the population of the town was estimated at 112,897. The current population of the town is not publicly known.

See also
 Harare
 Economy of Zimbabwe

References

Kadoma District
Populated places in Mashonaland West Province